Leverrett Oley Larsen (born October 18, 1964) is a former Republican member of the North Dakota Senate for the 3rd district.

Career
He has been a member of the North Dakota Senate since 2010. He is opposed to anti-bullying legislation, arguing that it would promote a victim mentality. He has been published in Psychology Today. He supports the right to bear arms in the workplace.

He was elected State Senate President Pro Tempore 2020. he was elected chairman of the Bastiat Caucus. His greatest floor speeches to date was the defeat of the  recreational marijuana bill on the Senate floor, and overturning the governor's veto on the mask mandate. He is one of the most conservative legislators in the North Dakota Senate. He is a member of the Pro-Life caucus, National Prayer Caucus and the Republican Party Caucus.

Personal life
Larsen received a Bachelor of Science in Vocational Education from Valley City State University and a Masters of Science in Educational Leadership from North Dakota State University. He was a teacher of Automotive Technology at a local high school.
Currently, he is self-employed at Oley Larsen 4 Insurance Agency LLC specializing in health insurance, Medicare supplements, Marketplace, and Allstate supplemental benefits. He also continues in the Diesel Technology field for a local sanitation company.

He is married to Elizabeth Larsen, and they have two children. They live in Minot, North Dakota.

References

1964 births
21st-century American politicians
Living people
Republican Party North Dakota state senators
North Dakota State University alumni
People from Minot, North Dakota
Valley City State University alumni